Ramón Gato Moya (born ) is a former Cuban male volleyball player. He was part of the Cuba men's national volleyball team. He competed with the national team at the 2000 Summer Olympics in Sydney, Australia, finishing 7th. He played with La Fenice Volley Isernia.

See also
 Cuba at the 2000 Summer Olympics

References

External links
 profile at sports-reference.com

1973 births
Living people
Cuban men's volleyball players
Place of birth missing (living people)
Volleyball players at the 2000 Summer Olympics
Olympic volleyball players of Cuba
Pan American Games medalists in volleyball
Pan American Games bronze medalists for Cuba
Medalists at the 1995 Pan American Games
20th-century Cuban people